The Dornier Do 317 was a prototype German medium bomber of World War II.

Design and development
In June 1940, Dornier produced plans for a further development of the Do 217, which would have a pressurized cabin and more powerful engines (DB 604, BMW 802 or Jumo 222). Designated Do 317, it was one of the proposals submitted to the RLM for the "Bomber B" project. Two versions of the Do 317 were proposed: the simplified Do 317A, powered by two DB 603A engines and featuring conventional defensive armament, and the more advanced Do 317B with the heavy, 1.5 tonnes apiece, counter-rotating DB 610A/B "power system" engines, remotely aimed Fernbedienbare Drehlafette (FDL)-style gun turrets, higher bombload, and an extended wing. The "Bomber B" project was partially based on improved engines, however its engines such as the DB 604 and Jumo 222 failed to reach full production. As a result, the Do 317 had to use the less powerful engines.

Six prototypes of the Do 317A were ordered, and the first of these, the Do 317 V1, commenced its flight test program on 8 September 1943. The Do 317 V1 was very similar in appearance to the Do 217K and M models, with a visually reframed slight variation of its multiple glazed-panel "stepless cockpit", fully glazed nose design that accommodated a pressurized cabin provision, and triangular tailfins. Trials with the Do 317 V1 revealed no real performance advance over the Do 217, so it was decided to complete the remaining five prototypes without cabin pressurization equipment and fit them out with FuG 203 Kehl radio guidance transmitting gear to employ them as Henschel Hs 293 missile launchers. In this form, the prototypes were redesignated Do 217R. At this time, the Do 317B project was abandoned due to changing wartime conditions.

Specifications (Do 317A)

See also

Notes

References

 Griehl, M. Dornier Do 217-317-417: an Operation History. Airlife, 1991.
 Green, W. Warplanes of the Third Reich. Galahad Books, 1986.
 D. Herwig & H. Rode Luftwaffe Secret Projects - Ground Attack & Special Purpose Aircraft. 
 

Abandoned military aircraft projects of Germany
Do 317
1940s German bomber aircraft
World War II medium bombers of Germany
High-wing aircraft
Aircraft first flown in 1943
Twin piston-engined tractor aircraft